Allan Victor Kneese (5 April 1930, Fredericksburg, Texas - 14 March 2001) was a pioneer in what came to be called environmental economics. He worked at Resources for the Future from 1961 onwards. He earned a master's degree from the University of Colorado, and a Ph.D. in 1956 from Indiana University.

Kneese' research focussed on the integration of environmental pollution in economic models, and on the use of economic incentives to encourage environmental improvements.

Kneese was the first president of the Association of Environmental and Resource Economists, and was a founding editor of the Journal of Environmental Economics and Management and Water Resources Research. With John V. Krutilla, he was the inaugural winner of the Volvo Environment Prize in 1990.

Publications
 
 
 
 Kneese, Allan V., Robert U. Ayres and Ralph C. d'Arge (1970). Economics and the Environment - A Materials Balance Approach. RFF Press 
 
 
 

 Kneese, Allan V. (1995). Natural Resource Economics. Edward Elgar

References

Indiana University alumni
University of Colorado alumni
1930 births
2001 deaths
20th-century American economists
Environmental economists
Resources for the Future